Pictures at an Exhibition is a suite of ten piano pieces composed by Modest Mussorgsky.

Pictures at an Exhibition may also refer to:
 Pictures at an Exhibition (Stokowski orchestration), a 1939 orchestration by Leopold Stokowski
 Pictures at an Exhibition (ballet), a ballet by Alexei Ratmansky
 Pictures at an Exhibition, a novel by Sara Houghteling
 Pictures at an Exhibition (Emerson, Lake & Palmer album), an album by Emerson, Lake & Palmer
 Pictures at an Exhibition, an album by Isao Tomita
 Pictures at an Exhibition, an album by Mekong Delta
 "Pictures in an Exhibition", a song on the Death Cab for Cutie Album You Can Play These Songs with Chords
 Pictures at an Exhibition, an animated film by Osamu Tezuka

See also
"Promenade (Satellite Pictures at an Exhibition)", a song from the 2014 Neil Cicierega mashup album Mouth Sounds